John Isner was the defending champion, but withdrew to concentrate on preparing for the Australian Open.
Jiří Veselý won the title, defeating Adrian Mannarino in the final, 6–3, 6–2.

Seeds
The top four seeds receive a bye into the second round.

Draw

Finals

Top half

Bottom half

Qualifying

Seeds
The top seven seeds receive a bye into the second round.

Qualifiers

Lucky losers

Draw

First qualifier

Second qualifier

Third qualifier

Fourth qualifier

References

External links
 Main Draw
 Qualifying Draw

2015 Singles
2015 ATP World Tour
2015 in New Zealand tennis
Singles